Jonas Algirdas Antanaitis (19 August 1921 – 7 September 2018) was a Lithuanian politician who was a long-term member of the Seimas.

Biography
Antanaitis was born in Rimšiniai village, Pakruojis district, Lithuania on 19 August 1921. He studied engineering at Vytautas Magnus University.

After the Soviet Union occupied and annexed Lithuania, Antanaitis was a member of the resistance. He was arrested in 1944 and deported to Siberia. He returned to Lithuania in 1954, working as an engineer.

In 1995, Antanaitis became a member of the Sixth Seimas through the electoral list of the Social Democratic Party of Lithuania.

References

1921 births
2018 deaths
Members of the Seimas
Social Democratic Party of Lithuania politicians
Vytautas Magnus University alumni
People from Pakruojis District Municipality
Soviet people